Huilong is a town under the administration of Qionglai City in central Sichuan province, China, situated  southeast of downtown Qionglai and more than twice that southwest of Chengdu. , it has two residential communities (社区) and seven villages under its administration.

See also 
 List of township-level divisions of Sichuan

References 

Towns in Sichuan
Qionglai City